Sékou Doumbia (born 11 February 1994) is an Ivorian footballer who plays as a midfielder for Maktaaral.

Career
In 2014, he joined Moldovan side Saxan. In 2015, he was transferred to Zaria Bălți. In the summer of 2016, he joined Belarusian club FC Slutsk.

On 21 July 2022, FC Maktaaral announced the signing of Doumbia.

References

External links

1994 births
Living people
People from Adzopé
Ivorian footballers
FC Saxan players
CSF Bălți players
FC Slutsk players
FC Tambov players
FC Armavir players
Hapoel Hadera F.C. players
FC Ordabasy players
FC Maktaaral players
Moldovan Super Liga players
Belarusian Premier League players
Russian First League players
Israeli Premier League players
Association football midfielders
Ivorian expatriate footballers
Expatriate footballers in Moldova
Expatriate footballers in Belarus
Expatriate footballers in Russia
Expatriate footballers in Israel
Expatriate footballers in Kazakhstan
Ivorian expatriate sportspeople in Moldova
Ivorian expatriate sportspeople in Belarus
Ivorian expatriate sportspeople in Russia
Ivorian expatriate sportspeople in Israel